WSIA is a college radio station located on the campus of The College of Staten Island, part of the City University of New York. The station broadcasts on 88.9 MHz FM. WSIA is an alternative rock station, with specialty jazz, rock, and urban formatted content, in addition to talk radio.

WSIA transmits from a site atop Todt Hill to Staten Island, Brooklyn, Manhattan, and Queens, New York. WSIA can also be heard in parts of Middlesex County, New Jersey, Union County, New Jersey, Essex County, New Jersey, and Hudson County, New Jersey.

History 
In the mid 1970s, a group of students interested in radio gathered in a room used by the college amateur radio station, WB2BAZ, in the C Building of The College of Staten Island's Sunnyside campus. They ran some wire to the cafeteria and started spinning records. These students worked with the College and applied for an FM license. They were granted a construction permit.

In the late 1970s, a new group of students applied to the Student Government and Association for money to commence construction. In 1980 a general manager, Greg Adamo, was hired to handle the daily tasks of the station and coordinate the construction of the station. In early 1981, an agreement was reached to acquire an antenna site on Todt Hill which is noted as the tallest point on the East Coast. Phone lines were eventually installed for the transmitter. The remaining construction of the studio was expedited in the basement of the E Building on the Sunnyside campus. On August 31, 1981, WSIA commenced regularly scheduled programming. It was the culmination of a tremendous amount of hard work by members of the College and students.

For the next 12 years, WSIA languished somewhat invisibly in the E-building basement below the cafeteria at the Sunnyside campus. Few people at the college even knew the E-building had a basement or that The College of Staten Island had a radio station. However, many people from outside the immediate College community had come to realize just what WSIA was doing. With the format in place, WSIA began gaining a reputation for playing music that nobody else on the overcrowded New York radio dial was.

The founding members of WSIA include Ronald Resnick, Greg Cully, Joe Mininni, Karen Cino, Ace Martin, and Diane T (Champagne) amongst others.

A number of changes have happened since 1981. The station's offices and studios have been enlarged and improved.  In 1985, the College showed its commitment by picking up the salary of the General Manager. Previously, this had been paid out of student fees. The programming has also undergone a number of changes. Yet, students have always been committed to two things. One, to be new and innovative. The other, to serve the Staten Island community. Although WSIA was on the cutting edge in playing news music, the station was not highly promoted by the college. Most of the station's support was a direct result of its listeners as the station grew in recognition. In 1985 and 1986 WSIA was host to two regional conferences of the Intercollegiate Broadcasting Convention Intercollegiate Broadcasting System.

In 1993, the College of Staten Island moved its entire campus to a larger location. This enabled an opportunity for WSIA to obtain a state-of-the-art facility. The facility now houses a 64 track recording studio, multiple broadcast booths/rooms and full office space for its staff. The recording studio also houses musical instruments such as guitars, pianos, turntables, and much more.

WSIA Today 
WSIA serves as an outlet for breaking emerging artists to the mass public. The station and its studio is a learning ground for students and aspiring broadcast enthusiasts alike. The station is operated by an all-student Board of Directors.

Membership at WSIA is open to any student of The College of Staten Island, part-time or full-time.

Current Programming 
Since the early days, programming has undergone a number of changes. Despite the growth of the station, the students remain committed to using the facilities in new and innovate ways. The station remains a beneficial and influential outlet to its listeners and sponsors.

WSIA's current programming includes music, news, public affairs discussion, promotions, sports talk, and more. The music department broadcasts live programs catering to various genres of music. The stations music department is noted to have hosted many established recording artist's in-studio commentary and interviews. The sports department broadcasts many live events such as baseball, college basketball, football, and more. Local bands have been featured on the WSIA airwaves,

External links 
 

 WSIA on Twitter
 WSIA on Facebook
 The College of Staten Island

SIA
SIA
Radio stations established in 1981
1981 establishments in New York City
College of Staten Island